Fernanda Garay Rodrigues (born May 10, 1986) is a retired Brazilian professional volleyball player who won the 2012 Summer Olympics gold medal and the silver medal at 2020 Tokyo Summer Olympics with the Brazil national team. She plays with Praia Clube.

Career
Garay is a sergeant. She played at the 2011 Military World Games volleyball tournament, winning the gold medal and the Most Valuable Player and Best Spiker individual awards.

Playing with Sollys Nestlé Osasco, Garay won the gold medal in the 2012 FIVB Club World Championship held in Doha, Qatar.

Garay was awarded Best Spiker of the 2012/13 season of the Brazilian Superliga playing with Sollys/Nestlé. She was announced to play for Fenerbahçe for the 2013/14 club season.

She won one of the Best Outside Hitters awards during the 2013 South American Championship. Her National Team won the Continental Championship qualifying to the 2013 World Grand Champions Cup and the 2014 World Championship.

After signing with the Russian club, Dinamo Krasnodar for 2014/2015 she won the Russian Cup title and the 2015 FIVB Club World Championship silver medal when her team lost to the Turkish Eczacibasi VitrA in the championship match. She was recognized with the Best Outside Spiker individual award.
She previously announced the extension of her contract with Krasnodar for the 2015/2016 season, but the club experienced financial problems that led her sign with Dinamo Moscow for that season. With this team, she won the bronze medal of the Russian Cup in December 2015 and the Russian league championship in 2016 with a perfect season.

Garay won the silver medal at the 2015 Pan American Games when her national team was defeated in the championship match 0–3 by the United States.

After winning silver at 2020 Summer Olympics, Fernanda announced her retirement from international competitions along with libero Camila Brait.

Clubs
  São Caetano (2002–2004)
  MRV/Minas (2004–2005)
  Fiat/Minas (2005–2008)
  Pinheiros/Mackenzie (2008–2010)
  NEC Red Rockets (2010–2011)
  Vôlei Futuro (2011–2012)
  Sollys/Nestlé (2012–2013)
  Fenerbahçe Istanbul (2013–2014)
  Dinamo Krasnodar (2014–2015)
  Dinamo Moscow (2015–2016)
  Guangdong Evergrande (2016–2017)
  Praia Clube (2017–2021)

Awards
 2011 Military World Games – "Most Valuable Player"
 2011 Military World Games – "Best Spiker"
 2011 World Grand Prix – "Best Receiver"
 2011 South American Championship – "Best Receiver"
 2012 Summer Olympics South American qualification tournament – "Most Valuable Player"
 2012 Summer Olympics South American qualification tournament – "Best Spiker"
 2012 Summer Olympics – "Best Receiver"
 2012 South American Club Championship – "Best Receiver"
 2012–13 Brazilian Superliga – "Best Spiker"
 2013 Montreux Volley Masters – "Most Valuable Player"
 2013 South American Championship – "Best Outside Spiker"
 2015 FIVB Club World Championship – "Best Outside Spiker"
 2019 South American Club Championship – "Best Outside Spiker"

Clubs
 2012–13 Brazilian Superliga –  Runner-up, with Sollys Nestlé Osasco
 2014 Russian Cup –  Champion, with Dinamo Krasnodar
 2015–16 Russian Super League –  Champion, with Dinamo Moscow
 2017–18 Brazilian Superliga –  Champion, with Dentil/Praia Clube
 2018–19 Brazilian Superliga –  Runner-up, with Dentil/Praia Clube
 2020–21 Brazilian Superliga –  Runner-up, with Dentil/Praia Clube
 2013–14 CEV Cup –  Champion, with Fenerbahçe
 2014–15 CEV Cup –  Champion, with Dinamo Krasnodar
 2012 South American Club Championship –  Champion, with Sollys Nestlé Osasco
 2012 FIVB Club World Championship –  Champion, with Sollys Nestlé Osasco
 2015 FIVB Club World Championship –  Runner-up, with Dinamo Krasnodar
 2019 South American Club Championship –  Runner-up, with Dentil/Praia Clube
 2020 South American Club Championship –  Runner-up, with Dentil/Praia Clube

References

External links
 Fernanda Garay at the International Volleyball Federation
 
 
 
 

1986 births
Brazilian women's volleyball players
Living people
Olympic volleyball players of Brazil
Volleyball players at the 2012 Summer Olympics
Volleyball players at the 2016 Summer Olympics
Olympic gold medalists for Brazil
Olympic medalists in volleyball
Medalists at the 2012 Summer Olympics
Fenerbahçe volleyballers
Volleyball players at the 2011 Pan American Games
Volleyball players at the 2015 Pan American Games
Pan American Games gold medalists for Brazil
Pan American Games silver medalists for Brazil
Pan American Games medalists in volleyball
Outside hitters
Expatriate volleyball players in Japan
Expatriate volleyball players in Turkey
Expatriate volleyball players in Russia
Expatriate volleyball players in China
Brazilian expatriate sportspeople in Japan
Brazilian expatriate sportspeople in Turkey
Brazilian expatriates in Russia
Brazilian expatriate sportspeople in China
Medalists at the 2011 Pan American Games
Medalists at the 2015 Pan American Games
Volleyball players at the 2020 Summer Olympics
Medalists at the 2020 Summer Olympics
Olympic silver medalists for Brazil
Sportspeople from Porto Alegre
21st-century Brazilian women